The Episcopal Diocese of South Florida was a diocese of the Episcopal Church in the United States of America, which was created in 1922 out of what had been the Missionary Jurisdiction of Southern Florida, sometimes called the Missionary District of Southern Florida. which had been split off in 1892 from the Episcopal Diocese of Florida.  Its northern line was the southern boundaries of the counties of Levy. Alachua, Putnam and St. Johns. and covered the southern two-thirds of the Florida peninsula. Its see city was Orlando, Florida. In 1969, it was divided into three new dioceses as follows: the Episcopal Diocese of Central Florida with its see at Orlando, the Episcopal Diocese of Southeast Florida with its see at Miami and the Episcopal Diocese of Southwest Florida, with its see at St. Petersburg.

Missionary Bishops of Southern Florida
  1893-1913 William Crane Gray, Bishop
  1913-1922 Cameron Mann, Bishop, previously 3rd bishop of North Dakota

Bishops of South Florida

1.  1922-1932 Cameron Mann, first bishop of South Florida
   1925-1932 John D. Wing, Bishop Coadjutor
2.  1932-1950  John D. Wing, 2nd Bishop of South Florida
   1945-1948  Henry I. Louttit, Sr., Suffragan Bishop
   1948-1951  Henry I. Louttit, Sr., Bishop Coadjutor
3.  1951-1969  Henry I. Louttit, Sr., 3rd Bishop of South Florida
   1951-1956  Martin J. Bram, Suffragan Bishop
   1956-1961  William F. Moses, Suffragan Bishop
   1961-1969  William L. Hargrave, Suffragan Bishop, became first Bishop of Southwest Florida
   1961-1969  James L. Duncan, Suffragan Bishop, became first Bishop of Southeast Florida

References

Southeast Florida
Episcopal Church in Florida
Christian organizations established in 1922